
Year 512 (DXII) was a leap year starting on Sunday (link will display the full calendar) of the Julian calendar. In the Roman Empire, it was known as the Year of the Consulship of Paulus and Moschianus (or, less frequently, year 1265 Ab urbe condita). The denomination 512 for this year has been used since the early medieval period, when the Anno Domini calendar era became the prevalent method in Europe for naming years.

Events 
 By place 
 Byzantine Empire 
 Emperor Anastasius I ends a period of moderate eclectic policy, and starts strongly favoring his own monophysitist beliefs.
 Areobindus, Byzantine general, is proclaimed emperor during a riot at Constantinople but refuses to take part in the usurpation.
 Anastasius I constructs a wall from the Black Sea to the Sea of Marmara, to protect Constantinople from raiding Bulgars and Slavs.

 Europe 
 King Theodoric the Great grants citizens on Mount Vesuvius exemption from taxes, after a severe eruption in southeastern Italy.
 The Ostrogoths conquer the Frankish province Rouergue (Southern Gaul).

 Asia 
 The island nation of Usan-guk is conquered by the Silla Dynasty (Korea), under general Kim Isabu.

 By topic 
 Literature 
 The first written text in the Arabic alphabet is recorded at Zabad (Syria).

Births 
 David, Welsh bishop and saint (approximate date)
 Eutychius, patriarch of Constantinople (approximate date) 
 Maurus, Roman abbot and saint (d. 584)
 Wu Mingche, general of the Chen Dynasty (d. 578)
 Lady Xian, Chinese general (d. 602)

Deaths 
 Areobindus, Byzantine general and politician
 Wang Baoming, empress of Southern Qi (b. 455)

References